Pinda Simão is an Angolan politician who served as the governor of Uíge Province. He previously served as minister of Education and was a member of the Defense General Assembly.

Background and career 
Simão holds a master's degree in Economics and Education Planning. He entered the civil service as a technical staff of the ministry of Education and served as Director in various departments in the ministry from 1981 to 1997. From 1997 to 2010, he was Deputy minister – Education Reform before he was appointed minister of Education in 2010 and served until 2017 when he was appointed the governor of Uíge Province. His governorship tenure ended in 2020.

References 

Angolan politicians
Year of birth missing (living people)
Living people
Governors of Uíge